Dock Junction is a census-designated place (CDP) in Glynn County, Georgia, United States. It is part of the 'Brunswick, Georgia Metropolitan Statistical Area'. The population was 7,721 at the 2010 census. Its original name was Arco until the 1970s, the name deriving from the Atlantic Refining Company.

Geography

Dock Junction is located at  (31.201106, -81.506921).

Demographics

2020 census

As of the 2020 United States census, there were 8,266 people, 2,976 households, and 1,942 families residing in the CDP.

2000 census
As of the census of 2000, there were 6,951 people, 2,805 households, and 1,924 families residing in the CDP. The racial makeup of the CDP was 68.41% White, 29.06% African American, 0.19% Native American, 0.37% Asian, 0.13% Pacific Islander, 0.96% from other races, and 0.88% from two or more races. Hispanic or Latino of any race were 3.04% of the population.

There were 2,805 households, out of which 31.5% had children under the age of 18 living with them, 47.8% were married couples living together, 16.1% had a female householder with no husband present, and 31.4% were non-families. 26.5% of all households were made up of individuals, and 9.7% had someone living alone who was 65 years of age or older.  The average household size was 2.48 and the average family size was 2.97.

In the CDP, the population was spread out, with 26.2% under the age of 18, 8.7% from 18 to 24, 29.5% from 25 to 44, 22.3% from 45 to 64, and 13.3% who were 65 years of age or older.  The median age was 36 years. For every 100 females, there were 96.1 males.  For every 100 females age 18 and over, there were 91.0 males.

The median income for a household in the CDP was $28,371, and the median income for a family was $31,655. Males had a median income of $25,769 versus $20,168 for females. The per capita income for the CDP was $14,768.  About 17.2% of families and 18.8% of the population were below the poverty line, including 26.6% of those under age 18 and 12.5% of those age 65 or over.

Education
The community's public schools are operated by Glynn County School System.

Zoned schools serving sections of the CDP include:
 Glyndale Elementary School (GES), Golden Isles Elementary School (GIE), Goodyear Elementary School (GOE), and Sterling Elementary School (SES)
 Glynn Middle School (GMS), Jane Macon Middle School (JMS), Needwood Middle School (NMS), and Risley Middle School (RMS)
 Brunswick High School (BHS) and Glynn Academy (GA)

References

Census-designated places in Glynn County, Georgia
Census-designated places in Georgia (U.S. state)
Brunswick metropolitan area
Populated coastal places in Georgia (U.S. state)